Ritchi Iwa (born 31 August 1999) is a New Caledonian international footballer who plays as a midfielder for New Caledonia Super Ligue side FC Païta.

Career statistics

International

References

1999 births
Living people
New Caledonian footballers
New Caledonia international footballers
Association football midfielders